Colm McCarthy (born 16 February 1973) is a Scottish television director, who has directed several BBC drama productions.

Partial filmography
Krypton
"Pilot" (2018), by David S. Goyer, and Ian Goldberg

Black Mirror
"Black Museum" (2017), by Charlie Brooker

The Girl With All The Gifts
- Feature-length film, adapted from the M.R. Carey novel of the same name.

Peaky Blinders (TV Series) (6 episodes) 
Episode #2.6 (2014)
Episode #2.5 (2014)
Episode #2.4 (2014)
Episode #2.3 (2014)
Episode #2.2 (2014)
Episode #2.1 (2014)

Doctor Who
The Bells of Saint John (2013), by Steven Moffat

Ripper Street
The Weight of One Man's Heart (2013), by Toby Finlay
Tournament of Shadows (2013), by Toby Finlay

Sherlock
The Sign of Three (2014), by Stephen Thompson and Steven Moffat & Mark Gatiss
Injustice
Episode 1 (2011), by Anthony Horowitz
Episode 2 (2011), by Anthony Horowitz
Episode 3 (2011), by Anthony Horowitz
Episode 4 (2011), by Anthony Horowitz
Episode 5 (2011), by Anthony Horowitz

Outcast
Feature-length film, 2010, by Tom and Colm McCarthy

Endeavour
Endeavour (pilot, 2012), by Russell Lewis
Home (2013), by Russell Lewis

The Deep
Everything Put Together Falls Apart (2010), by Simon Donald
The Last Breath (2010), by Simon Donald

Hunter
Episode 1 (2009), by Gwyneth Hughes
Episode 2 (2009), by Gwyneth Hughes

Spooks
New Allegiances (2008), by Neil Cross & Ben Richards
Split Loyalties (2008), by Neil Cross & Ben Richards

Hustle
Ties That Bind Us (2006), by Steve Coombes
A Bollywood Dream (2006), by Danny Brown

As writer
Outcast
Feature-length film, 2010, with Tom McCarthy, also director

References

External links

Scottish television directors
1973 births
Living people